A cyclone is an area of closed, circular fluid motion characterized by inwardly spiraling winds.

Cyclone may also refer to:

Places
 Cyclone, Indiana, an unincorporated community
 Cyclone, Kentucky, an unincorporated community
 Cyclone, Missouri, an unincorporated community
 Cyclone, Pennsylvania, an unincorporated community
 Cyclone, West Virginia, an unincorporated community
 Cyclone Lake, a lake in Utah

Arts, entertainment, and media

Fictional entities
 Cyclone (DC Comics), a Justice Society of America heroine
 Cyclone (Marvel Comics), a fictional Spider-Man villain
 Cyclone, a type of transformable powered armor for infantry in the Robotech universe
 The Cyclone, a fictional motorcycle used by Kamen Rider 1

Films
 The Cyclone (1920 film), an American drama film by Clifford Smith
 Cyclone (1978 film), a film starring Arthur Kennedy and Carroll Baker
 Cyclone (1987 film), a science fiction film featuring Heather Thomas, Jeffrey Combs and Martin Landau
 The Cyclone (1996 film), an Italian film

Games
 Cyclone (pinball), a 1988 pinball game by Williams
 Cyclone (video game), a 1985 computer game for the ZX Spectrum
 CyClones, a video game by Raven Software

Music

Albums
 Cyclone (Tangerine Dream album)
 Cyclone (Baby Bash album) (2007)

Songs
 "Cyclone" (song), a 2007 song by Baby Bash
 "Cyclone", a 2009 song by Bruce Hornsby & The Noisemakers from  Levitate
 "Cyclone", a song by Dub Pistols
 "Cyclone", a song by 12012
 "Cyclone", a song by StillWell

Other music
 Fender Cyclone, an electric guitar
 The Cyclones, a New York City rock and roll band in the late 1970s and early 1980s

Other arts, entertainment, and media
 Cyclone!, a 1985 Australian superhero anthology comic book

Computing and technology
 Cyclone (programming language), a dialect of C
 Cyclone (separator), a cylinder used for cyclonic separation
 CYCLONE, an early computer
 Cyclone, a family of field-programmable gate arrays from Altera, now part of Intel's Programmable Solutions Group
 ACA Cyclone, a civil defense siren

Military and related areas
 38th Infantry Division (United States), nicknamed Cyclone
 Caudron C.714 Cyclone, an unsuccessful French fighter aircraft which saw some use early in World War II
 French ship Cyclone, one of several French navy ships named Cyclone
 Operation Cyclone, a CIA program to arm and finance Afghan mujahideen (1979-1989)
 Operation Cyclone, the Allied World War II assault on the Pacific island of Noemfoor, part of the Battle of Noemfoor
 Sikorsky CH-148 Cyclone, Canadian Forces Air Command designation for the Sikorsky H-92 Superhawk helicopter
 USS Cyclone (PC-1), a United States Navy coastal patrol ship
 Cyclone-class patrol ship
 Cyclone (rifle), one of three models manufactured by British company Steel Core Designs

Roller coasters
Cyclone (Dreamworld), a roller coaster at Dreamworld, Queensland, Australia
Cyclone (Lakeside Amusement Park), a wooden roller coaster at Lakeside Amusement Park in Denver, Colorado
Cyclone (Palisades Amusement Park), a pair of roller coasters that formerly operated at Palisades Amusement Park in Bergen County, New Jersey
Cyclone (Revere Beach), a roller coaster formerly at Revere Beach in Revere, Massachusetts
Cyclone, a roller coaster formerly at Geauga Lake, Aurora, Ohio
Cyclone, a roller coaster formerly at Cedar Point, Sandusky, Ohio
Carolina Cyclone, a roller coaster at Carowinds near Charlotte, North Carolina
Coney Island Cyclone, a roller coaster in Coney Island, New York
Crystal Beach Cyclone, a roller coaster at Crystal Beach, Ontario, Canada
Cyclone Coaster, a roller coaster at Sandspit Entertainment Cavendish Beach in Cavendish, Prince Edward Island, Canada
 Cyclone Racer, a twin track roller coaster at The Pike, Long Beach, California
Giant Cyclone Safety Coasters, a model line of steel-framed wood roller coasters designed by Harry Traver
Sesquicentennial Cyclone, a roller coaster formerly operated at the 1926 Philadelphia Sesquicentennial Exposition as well as other locations 
Texas Cyclone, a former roller coaster at the defunct Six Flags Astroworld, Houston, Texas
Twisted Cyclone, a roller coaster at Six Flags Over Georgia, Atlanta, Georgia
Wicked Cyclone, a roller coaster at Six Flags New England in Agawam, Massachusetts

Sports teams

Australia
 Cairns Cyclones, an Australian former rugby league club (1996-2000)
 Queensland Cyclones, a broomball team

Canada
 Cypress Cyclones, a Junior ice hockey franchise from Maple Creek, Saskatchewan
 Listowel Cyclones, a Junior ice hockey team based in Listowel, Ontario
 Tamworth Cyclones, a former Junior ice hockey team based in Tamworth, Ontario

United States
 Brooklyn Cyclones, a minor league baseball team
 Cincinnati Cyclones, a minor league hockey team
 Connecticut Cyclones, a team of the Women's Football Alliance
 H-Town Texas Cyclones, a former Independent Women's Football League team based in Houston, Texas
 Iowa State Cyclones, the Iowa State University sports teams
 Jacksonville Cyclones, a defunct American soccer team
 Twin City Cyclones, a former minor league ice hockey team based in Winston-Salem, North Carolina

Elsewhere
 Cyclones of Chittagong, a Bangladeshi cricket team
 Zhejiang Cyclones or Zhejiang Golden Bulls, a Chinese Basketball Association team

Transportation

Air
 St-Just Cyclone, a Canadian kit aircraft
 Wright Cyclone series, a family of piston engines for aircraft in the 1930s and 1940s

Land
 Cyclone (motorcycle), manufactured from 1912 through 1917
 Buell M2 Cyclone, a model of Buell Motorcycle Company motorcycle produced from 1997 to 2003
 Cadillac Cyclone, a 1959 concept car designed by Harley Earl
 Ford Cyclone engine, the codename of the Duratec 35
 Mercury Cyclone, a former mid-size muscle car 
 Raleigh Cyclone, a model of mountain bike

Sea
Capri Cyclone, an American sailing dinghy design

Other uses
 Cyclone (nickname)
 Cyclone fence, a type of wire-mesh fence
 Tetraphenylcyclopentadienone, an organic chemical

See also
 GMC Syclone, a high-performance version of the GMC Sonoma pickup truck
 Psyclone (roller coaster), a former roller coaster at Six Flags Magic Mountain, Valencia, Santa Clarita, California
 Tsyklon, a Ukrainian expendable space rocket